Wayne Péré (born March 23, 1965), sometimes credited as Wayne Pére or Wayne Pere, is an American character actor.

Life and career
Péré was born in Houma, Louisiana, and is the youngest of three brothers. After graduating high school, Péré had an interest in becoming a commercial diver and moved to Houston to learn the craft. He eventually grew bored with the job and quit. He followed his brothers' footsteps and headed to Louisiana State University where he discovered acting "by accident" while looking at courses relating to speech. After graduating, he began to star in various projects such as Galaxy Quest where he met a then unknown Sam Rockwell. He also guest starred in Northern Exposure, Ghost Whisperer and Nip/Tuck He was part of the main cast of the short lived series Dead Last.

Péré continued to appear in other shows such as Underground and made other appearances in film such as The Big Short, Trumbo and Free State of Jones. He joined the cast of Marvel's Cloak & Dagger as Peter Scarborough. He also appeared in Venom alongside Tom Hardy and Riz Ahmed and made appearances in the HBO series Tracey Takes On... and Watchmen, as well as the films Trial by Fire and Capone.

Filmography

References

External links

1965 births
Living people
20th-century American male actors
21st-century American male actors
American male film actors
American male television actors
American people of French descent
Male actors from Louisiana
Louisiana State University alumni
People from Houma, Louisiana